The Pamyat Society (English translation: "Memory" Society), officially National Patriotic Front "Memory" (NPF "Memory"; ; Natsionalno-patrioticheskiy front «Pamyat», NPF «Pamyat»), was a Russian ultranationalist organization that identified itself as the "People's National-Patriotic Orthodox Christian movement." The group's stated focus is preserving Russian culture. Its longtime leader, Dmitri Vasilyev, died in 2003. The organisation was described as anti-Semitic and chauvinist. The group disappeared by the 1990s and was split into other groups like The National Patriotic Front and The Russian National Unity.

History
At the end of the 1970s, a historical association called Vityaz (lit. "Knight"), sponsored by the Soviet Society for the Protection of Historical and Cultural Monuments, established an "informal historical, cultural and educational organization" uniting activists-bibliophiles and amateur historians. One of the purposes of the newly formed organization was to prepare the upcoming celebration of the 600th anniversary of the Battle of Kulikovo.
 
Some notable Vityaz activists in Moscow were Ilya Glazunov (artist), S. Malyshev (historian), and A. Lebedev (Colonel of the MVD). Similar groups were created in other regions of the Soviet Union. Later, loosely associated "informal" groups were consolidated under the name Pamyat.

At an internal meeting on October 4, 1985, Pamyat split up into several factions, many of which attempted to retain the same name as the "true" Pamyat. One of them, the so-called Vasilyev's group, led by Dmitri Vasilyev (a former worker in Glazunov's studio), A. Andreyev and A. Gladkov, focused its activities on the media.

On May 6, 1987, Pamyat conducted an unregistered and thus illegal demonstration in the center of Moscow to demand the end to the construction of an officially-sanctioned memorial project at Poklonnaya Hill. It resulted in a two-hour meeting with Boris Yeltsin, at that time the First Secretary of the Moscow City Committee of the Communist Party of the Soviet Union.

In the fall of 1987, the National-Patriotic Front (NPF) was founded, with the aim of "renaissance", with the intent to "lead Russian people to the spiritual and national revival" on the basis of "three traditional Russian values": Orthodoxy, national character and spirituality.
 
After several splits and the imminent dissolution of the Soviet Union, the organization adopted a monarchist position.

In August 1990, a permanent NPF council member, Aleksandr Barkashov (the author of the book The ABC of a Russian Nationalist), caused another split after his announcement of being "tired to be preoccupied by recollections". He said that "it is time to act". His new group was dubbed "Russian National Unity" (Русское Национальное Единство). Barkashov promoted the veneration of the swastika. 

In 1991, the organization's newspaper (print run of 100,000) and radio station (both officially registered) were launched.

By the late 1990s, the original Pamyat disappeared from the public scene. Dmitry Vasilyev died on July 17, 2003. The organization reactivated in 2005 and participated in the Russian marches.

On September 1, 2021, it became known about the death of Nikolai Skorodumov: according to a post by Vladimir Basmanov on the Vkontakte social network, Nikolai Skorodumov died on June 10, 2021, at the age of 70 in a Zelenograd hospital

Ideology
The recurring motive in the group's ideology was the claim of the existence of a so-called "Ziono-Masonic plot" against Russia as "the main source of the misfortunes of Russian people, disintegration of the economy, denationalization of Russian culture, alcoholism, ecological crisis" (according to Pamyat). The Zionists were also blamed for the triggering of the revolutions in 1905 and 1917, the death of millions in the course of the Russian Civil War and for Joseph Stalin's personality cult. The contemporary Soviet government apparatus was alleged to be infiltrated by "Zionists and freemasons" working as "agents of Zionism" and serving the purpose of subordinating the Soviet government to the "Jewish capital". The "Zionist Occupation Government" accusation was often used by Pamyat.

In 1993, a District Court in Moscow formally ruled that The Protocols of the Elders of Zion were a fake, and dismissed a libel suit by Pamyat. The organization was criticized for using the document in their publications.

The group disappeared by the 1990s and was split into other groups like The National Patriotic Front and The Russian National Unity.

Quotes
From the open letter of the NPF "Pamyat" leader D. Vasilyev to the President of the Russian Federation Boris Yeltsin:
 "... Your Jewish entourage... have already made good use of you and don't need you anymore. You will share the destiny of Napoleon, Hitler, etc. who were Zionist-maintained dictators... The aim of international Zionism is to seize power worldwide. For this reason Zionists struggle against national and religious traditions of other nations, and for this purpose they devised the Freemasonic concept of cosmopolitanism."

From the open letter of the NPF "Pamyat" leader D. Vasilyev to the President of the Russian Federation Vladimir Putin:
"Mr. President, your initiative to make taxes lower meets our demands. It is a positive step. Unfortunately, modern economy is an economy of national minority, which oppresses the majority. They are real suckers of our money, mineral resources etc. 
Banks should not sell money and make it some kind of tradable good. They should serve the production sphere of economy. We are against a multiparty political system. Many parties mean distribution of egoism, blackmail etc. Russia has its own history, which is 1000 years old. It makes no sense to copy the western institutions in toto. They might be positive and efficient in small European countries, but in such a big country like Russia a weak, corrupted parliamentarian system means anarchy and fosters economic and politic separatism."

Further reading
William Korey, Russian Antisemitism, Pamyat, and the Demonology of Zionism, Harwood Academic Pub, 2007
Walter Laqueur, Black Hundreds : the Rise of the Extreme Right in Russia, New York : HarperCollins, 1993
Marlène Laruelle, Le Rouge et le noir. Extrême droite et nationalisme en Russie, Paris, Éditions du CNRS, 2007

See also
Anti-Zionist Committee of the Soviet Public

References

External links
Russian Antisemitism, Pamyat, and the Demonology of Zionism by William Korey
Russia's "Red-Brown" Hawks The Bulletin of the Atomic Scientists, Vitalii Goldanskii, June 1993
Pamyat: Call to Russian People (in Russian)
Nationalism and Xenophobia in Russia (in Russian) 

1980 establishments in Russia
Antisemitism in Russia
Conservative parties in Russia
Eastern Orthodoxy and far-right politics
Eastern Orthodoxy in Russia
Far-right political parties in Russia
Monarchist parties in Russia
National conservative parties
Nationalist parties in Russia
Political parties established in 1980
Political parties disestablished in 2021
Political parties in the Soviet Union
Russian nationalist organizations